Bernice Surprise Summerfield (later Professor Bernice Summerfield or just Benny) is a fictional character created by author Paul Cornell as a new companion of the Seventh Doctor in Virgin Publishing's range of original full-length Doctor Who novels, the New Adventures. The New Adventures were authorised novels carrying on from where the Doctor Who television series had left off, and Summerfield was introduced in Cornell's novel Love and War in 1992.

History
A 26th century archeologist, Summerfield became a hugely popular character amongst fans of the books, and was present right up until their end in 1997. She officially stopped travelling with the Doctor in Happy Endings but returned a few times thereafter, including the last Virgin New Adventure, The Dying Days. That year, Virgin had lost the licence to publish Doctor Who fiction, which was not renewed by the BBC. However, range editors Peter Darvill-Evans and Rebecca Levene decided to continue the series with Summerfield as the new lead and without the Doctor Who name, the Doctor or any other BBC copyright characters featuring.

These New Adventures starring Bernice continued until 1999, when the Virgin fiction department closed down. The previous year, however, audio production company Big Finish Productions began issuing full-cast, officially licensed professional audio dramas starring the character on CD, and they continue to do so, making her the longest running audio drama series in the world, the longest running science fiction audio drama series, the longest running audio drama series with a female lead, and - together with the books - the longest-running science fiction series with a female lead. The character is played in all Big Finish's productions by actress Lisa Bowerman, who also reprised the role in the live-action fan film The Crystal Conundrum and a video advertisement for the audio The Triumph of Sutekh. After they gained the license to produce Doctor Who audio dramas in 1999, Big Finish thrice featured Bernice in Doctor Who stories set during and after the run of the New Adventures novels.

Big Finish are still regularly producing Bernice Summerfield audio dramas and the company has also published various novels and short story collections featuring the character.

Bernice also appeared in several comic strips in Doctor Who Magazine, with Virgin and the magazine co-operating on her visual depiction. This depiction, which was also applied to novel cover art, was of a slim, statuesque build, with short dark hair, usually shown wearing a catsuit or some similar outfit. Over time, the character's appearance has been modified and among recent changes include a longer hairstyle.

Books

Doctor Who – The New Adventures

Love and War by Paul Cornell
Transit by Ben Aaronovitch
The Highest Science by Gareth Roberts
The Pit by Neil Penswick
Deceit by Peter Darvill-Evans
Lucifer Rising by Andy Lane and Jim Mortimore
White Darkness by David A McIntee
Shadowmind by Christopher Bulis
Birthright by Nigel Robinson
Blood Heat by Jim Mortimore
The Dimension Riders by Daniel Blythe
The Left-Handed Hummingbird by Kate Orman
Conundrum by Steve Lyons
No Future by Paul Cornell
Tragedy Day by Gareth Roberts
Legacy by Gary Russell
Theatre of War by Justin Richards
All-Consuming Fire by Andy Lane
Blood Harvest by Terrance Dicks
Strange England by Simon Messingham
First Frontier by David A McIntee
St Anthony's Fire by Mark Gatiss
Falls the Shadow by Daniel O'Mahony
Parasite by Jim Mortimore
Warlock by Andrew Cartmel
Set Piece by Kate Orman
Infinite Requiem by Daniel Blythe
Sanctuary by David A McIntee
Human Nature by Paul Cornell
Original Sin by Andy Lane
Sky Pirates! by Dave Stone
Zamper by Gareth Roberts
Toy Soldiers by Paul Leonard
Head Games by Steve Lyons
The Also People by Ben Aaronovitch
Shakedown by Terrance Dicks
Just War by Lance Parkin
Warchild by Andrew Cartmel
Sleepy by Kate Orman
Death and Diplomacy by Dave Stone
Happy Endings by Paul Cornell
Return of the Living Dad by Kate Orman
Eternity Weeps by Jim Mortimore
The Dying Days by Lance Parkin

The Doctor first meets Benny in Love and War - she is a 30-year-old archaeologist. She was born in 2540 and is the daughter of Admiral Isaac Douglas Summerfield - a high ranking Spacefleet officer. Her mother, Claire Summerfield, died when Daleks attacked their homeworld of Beta Caprisis, an Earth colony. She has not seen her father for many years and has spent much of her life searching for him.

At times she falsely claims to have a degree from Heidelberg University. She published an archaeological book called Down Among the Dead Men in the year 2566.

Theatre of War features the first encounter between Bernice and Irving Braxiatel (from her perspective). He later becomes a regular character in the Bernice Summerfield-only New Adventures.

In Sanctuary Bernice falls in love with Guy de Carnac, a former Knight Templar.  Unfortunately he is killed later in the novel.

In Death and Diplomacy she meets her future husband Jason Kane, who she marries in the very next novel, Happy Endings. Happy Endings is set on the occasion of Bernice's wedding to Jason Kane. Bernice leaves the TARDIS after this novel having been given Time Rings by the Doctor, but she appears in certain subsequent Doctor Who novels.

In Return of the Living Dad, Bernice finally resolves the mystery of what happened to her father.

Virgin had long considered a non-Doctor Who spin-off series, but plans were moved forwards when they lost the license from the BBC. A number of preparations were made for the transition to Bernice-led New Adventures (see below). As Virgin felt Bernice would make a better lead as a single woman, her marriage to Jason Kane was split up. Thus, she appears again in Eternity Weeps, a novel which describes the breakdown of her marriage and is also focused on her more than the Doctor as a prototype for the Doctor-free novels to come. Likewise, the last New Adventure, The Dying Days, is again focused on Bernice more than the Doctor, with the Doctor absent from a substantial portion of the book. The Dying Days also features an ambiguous epilogue which can be taken to imply that the Doctor and Bernice have sex.

This same epilogue also has the Doctor indicating that Benny is his longest-serving companion, although exactly how long she travelled with the Doctor has never been firmly established.

The New Adventures
Oh No It Isn't! by Paul Cornell
Dragons' Wrath by Justin Richards
Beyond the Sun by Matt Jones
Ship of Fools by Dave Stone
Down by Lawrence Miles
Deadfall by Gary Russell
Ghost Devices by Simon Bucher-Jones
Mean Streets by Terrance Dicks
Tempest by Christopher Bulis
Walking to Babylon by Kate Orman
Oblivion by Dave Stone
The Medusa Effect by Justin Richards
Dry Pilgrimage by Paul Leonard and Nick Walters
The Sword of Forever by Jim Mortimore
Another Girl, Another Planet by Martin Day and Len Beech
Beige Planet Mars by Lance Parkin and Mark Clapham
Where Angels Fear by Rebecca Levene and Simon Winstone
The Mary-Sue Extrusion by Dave Stone
Dead Romance by Lawrence Miles (Bernice Summerfield does not appear)
Tears of the Oracle by Justin Richards
Return to the Fractured Planet by Dave Stone
The Joy Device by Justin Richards
Twilight of the Gods by Mark Clapham and Jon de Burgh Miller

Originally published monthly, the New Adventures went bimonthly after The Sword of Forever.

The New Adventures continued with Bernice generally in the leading role. Oh No It Isn't! provides the set-up for subsequent stories, with Bernice becoming Professor of Archaeology at St Oscar's University on the planet Dellah. She has now put her failed marriage to Jason Kane behind her. Oh No It Isn't! also re-introduces the People, a highly advanced alien race from the Doctor Who New Adventures. In Ghost Devices, we meet Clarence (named after the angel in It's a Wonderful Life). Clarence appears in the form of an angel, but is an artificial intelligence from the People who is eventually (in Tears of the Oracle) revealed to be a character from The Also People. In Dragons' Wrath, Bernice meets Irving Braxiatel for the first time (from his perspective). Beyond the Sun introduces another recurring character, Emile Mars-Smith. Emile, Clarence and the People appear in a number of subsequent New Adventures, while Braxiatel appears in both further New Adventures and Benny stories from Big Finish.

Where Angels Fear starts the Gods arc, a loose overarching story that finishes in Twilight of the Gods. Along the way, Dellah is destroyed and Bernice is uprooted and loses her memory. Twilight of the Gods finishes with a new set-up for subsequent stories involving Bernice, Emile and others, but this was not used as Virgin stopped publishing the series.

As well as continuing the New Adventures after losing the Doctor Who license, Virgin also continued with their Decalog series. These had been Doctor Who short story anthologies, but Decalog 5: Wonders featured a Benny short story ("The Judgement of Solomon") by Lawrence Miles alongside other shorts not set in the New Adventures continuity.

Big Finish paperback novels
The Doomsday Manuscript by Justin Richards
The Gods of the Underworld by Stephen Cole
The Squire's Crystal by Jacqueline Rayner
The Infernal Nexus by Dave Stone
The Glass Prison by Jacqueline Rayner

Big Finish licensed the character of Bernice Summerfield from Paul Cornell, Irving Braxiatel from Justin Richards and Jason Kane from Dave Stone, but other elements of the Virgin New Adventures' fictional universe were not obtained. Instead, Gary Russell, Jacqueline Rayner and Cornell developed a new background and character ensemble, introduced in the anthology The Dead Men Diaries and developed in the initial run of paperbacks.

The most notable development in Big Finish's paperback novels was Bernice's pregnancy and the birth of her son in The Glass Prison.

The paperback novels proved uneconomic and Big Finish stopped publishing them, subsequently re-launching their Benny books in hardback with the anthology A Life of Surprises.

Big Finish hardcover novels
The Big Hunt by Lance Parkin
The Tree of Life by Mark Michalowski
Genius Loci by Ben Aaronovitch
The Two Jasons by Dave Stone
Terra Incognita by Ben Aaronovitch — originally announced in 2007, this novel remains unpublished save for an extract in Missing Adventures
The Weather on Versimmon by Matthew Griffiths
The Slender-Fingered Cats of Bubastis by Xanna Eve Chown 
Filthy Lucre by James Parsons and Andrew Stirling-Brown
Adorable Illusion by Gary Russell

Big Finish novellas
Each volume comprises a collection of three novellas.
A Life in Pieces by Dave Stone, Paul Sutton and Joseph Lidster
Parallel Lives by Rebecca Levene, Stewart Sheargold and Dave Stone, with linking material by Simon Guerrier
Old Friends by Jonathan Clements, Marc Platt and Pete Kempshall
Nobody's Children by Kate Orman, Jonathan Blum and Philip Purser-Hallard
The Vampire Curse by Mags L Halliday, Kelly Hale and Philip Purser-Hallard

Big Finish anthologies
The Dead Men Diaries, edited by Paul Cornell
A Life of Surprises, edited by Paul Cornell
Life During Wartime, edited by Paul Cornell
A Life Worth Living, edited by Simon Guerrier
Something Changed, edited by Simon Guerrier
Collected Works, edited by Nick Wallace
Missing Adventures, edited by Rebecca Levene
Secret Histories, edited by Mark Clapham
Present Danger, edited by Eddie Robson
True Stories (2017), edited by Xanna Eve Chown
In Time (2018), edited by Xanna Eve Chown
The Christmas Collection (2020), edited by Xanna Eve Chown

Short Trips

Bernice also appears in a number of Doctor Who short stories, mostly set during her travels with the Doctor.

"The Trials of Tara" by Paul Cornell (Decalog 2: Lost Property)
"Continuity Errors" by Steven Moffat (Decalog 3: Consequences)
"The Judgement of Soloman" by Lawrence Miles (Decalog 5: Wonders)
"Virgin Lands" by Sarah Groenewegen (Short Trips: Zodiac)
"Of the Mermaid and Jupiter" by Ian Mond & Danny Heap (Short Trips: Past Tense)
"Cold War" by Rebecca Levene (Short Trips: Steel Skies)
"...Be Forgot" by Cavan Scott and Mark Wright (Short Trips: A Christmas Treasury) - set during Big Finish's Bernice audio series
"Too Rich for My Blood" by Rebecca Levene (Short Trips: Seven Deadly Sins)
"How You Get There" by Simon Guerrier (Short Trips: A Day in the Life)
"Larkspur" by Mark Stevens (Short Trips: Transmissions)

New Series Adventures

Bernice appears in one of the New Series Adventures with the Twelfth Doctor (the novel was originally planned for River Song, but plans for the 2015 Christmas special The Husbands of River Song prompted Russell to use Benny instead).

Big Bang Generation by Gary Russell

Audio plays

Cast and characters

Bernice Summerfield

Season 1 (1998–2000)
The first season of Bernice Summerfield audio plays are all adaptations of New Adventures novels originally published by Virgin Publishing. Each of the plays spans two CDs, except for Dragon's Wrath, which was issued on a single CD.

The plays deviate from the original novels, in terms of plot and characters, to varying degrees. This is particularly evident with the productions of Birthright and Just War, both of which were originally Doctor Who novels. These changes were necessary because, at the time of their production, Big Finish Productions weren't licensed to produce Doctor Who audio plays.

Actor and photographer Lisa Bowerman was cast in the role of Bernice Summerfield. Bowerman had previously appeared in the Doctor Who story Survival (1989). The first series also co-starred Stephen Fewell as Jason Kane. A variety of actors familiar to Doctor Who fans played guest roles in many of the plays, including Colin Baker, Sophie Aldred, Nicholas Courtney, Elisabeth Sladen, Anneke Wills and Richard Franklin.

Season 2 (2000–01)
For the second season of Bernice Summerfield audio plays, Big Finish Productions experimented by developing ongoing character arcs that alternated between two different mediums—the audio plays and novels. Fans who did not collect the novels were initially confused to discover that Benny was pregnant during the final audio play of the season, The Skymines of Karthos. The pregnancy was explained in the novel The Squire's Crystal by Jacqueline Rayner.

The run of plays from the second season onwards take part in what has become known as the Collection continuity, as they are set primarily on the Braxiatel Collection, a combined museum and university located on the planetoid KS-159. A number of regular characters are introduced, most notably Irving Braxiatel. First referenced in the 1979 Doctor Who story City of Death (written by Douglas Adams and Graham Williams), Braxiatel first appeared in person in the New Adventures novel Theatre of War.

Season 3 (2002–03)
Whereas the previous seasons had focused primarily on the character of Bernice Summerfield, Big Finish used the third season as an opportunity to introduce an ensemble feel to the productions. This is most evident in The Green-Eyed Monsters and The Mirror Effect where the characters Jason Kane, Adrian Wall and Irving Braxiatel are significantly developed. The latter, in particular, suggests that Braxiatel has a darker, more mysterious past than the audience has previously been led to believe.

The other two plays that comprise the third season focus more specifically on Bernice. The Greatest Shop in the Galaxy remains the most light-hearted play of the season, while The Dance of the Dead reintroduces the Ice Warriors from Doctor Who.

While not officially part of the third season (at least as far as the numbering is concerned), the Bernice Summerfield audio play The Plague Herds of Excelis (the fourth play in Big Finish's Excelis series; the first three plays fall under the Doctor Who umbrella) takes place between The Green-Eyed Monsters and The Dance of the Dead. Chronologically, the short story anthology A Life of Surprises also falls within this gap.

Season 4 (2003–04)
The fourth season was unofficially dubbed the "classic Who monsters" season, with each play featuring an alien adversary that previously appeared in the Doctor Who television series. The Bellotron Incident predominantly features the Rutan Host (their major enemies, the Sontarans, are also referred to but don't actually appear), The Draconian Rage features the Draconians, The Poison Seas casts a more sympathetic light on the Sea Devils, while Death and the Daleks (the first double CD release in the series since Just War) sees the first appearance of the Daleks within the Bernice Summerfield series. Prior to its release, Death and the Daleks was entitled The Axis of Evil to keep the appearance of the Daleks a secret.

Big Finish also published an anthology of short stories, entitled Life During Wartime, that was specially written as a prelude to the Death and the Daleks audio play. Paul Cornell, the anthology's editor, described Life During Wartime as "a novel written by multiple authors". Each of the collection's stories are told in chronological order, detailing events that occur when the Collection is occupied by a powerful alien force. The anthology ends on a cliff-hanger that is resolved in Death and the Daleks.

Season 5 (2004–05)
The previous season's tradition of using classic monsters continues into the fifth season, with the Grel (previously heard in Oh No It Isn't!) returning in The Grel Escape, a knowing pastiche of The Chase. The Bone of Contention features the Galyari, who appeared in the Doctor Who audio play The Sandman, while the title and plot of The Relics of Jegg-Sau was inspired by a 1970s Doctor Who licensed jigsaw puzzle that depicted a scene with giant robots identical to the one that appeared in Robot.

The Masquerade of Death brings the fifth season to a close in a suitably dark and surreal fashion.

Season 6 (2005–06)
By the end of The Crystal of Cantus, the true dark and manipulative nature of Braxiatel was revealed and he left the Collection. Its future is now uncertain, with the Draconians claiming they own the planetoid on what it is based. The entire series was directed by Gary Russell.

Season 7 (2006)
The seventh season follows the staff of the Collection as they attempt to keep things running smoothly in Braxiatel's absence. Collected Works and Old Friends, two books published during this season's run, also develop the running plots that planetoid KS-159 is under threat from the Draconians and Mim, and that the Collection itself is falling apart literally as well as figuratively without Braxiatel at its helm.

Season 8 (2007–08)
In the eighth season, Braxiatel returns to the Collection, which is threatened by crossfire and politics in the war between the Draconians and Mim. The war comes to an unexpected conclusion shortly after his return, and several regular characters pay a heavy price for realising too late that Braxiatel himself is the real threat. The season ends with Benny cutting her ties to the Collection and Braxiatel, and going on the run with her son Peter. The books The Two Jasons and Nobody's Children also fit into this season's arc.

Season 9 (2008)
The ninth season is a much looser collection of stories, following Bernice and her son Peter as Benny searches for work away from the Collection.

Season 10 (2009)
The entire series was directed by John Ainsworth.

Season 11 (2010)
The entire series was again directed by John Ainsworth. The animated short Dead and Buried, released online for free, acted as a prelude to this series.

Boxset 1: Epoch (2011)

Boxset 2: Road Trip (2012)

Boxset 3: Legion (2012)

Boxset 4: New Frontiers (2013)

Boxset 5: Missing Persons (2013)

Boxset 6: The Story So Far (2018)

Specials

The New Adventures of Bernice Summerfield
Following the conclusion of the Bernice Summerfield box set range, a new range starring Lisa Bowerman as Bernice Summerfield alongside Sylvester McCoy as the Doctor entitled The New Adventures of Bernice Summerfield was launched.

Volume 1 (2014)

Volume 2: The Triumph of Sutekh (2015)

Volume 3: The Unbound Universe (2016)
Bernice Summerfield in a series of adventures with a version of the Doctor from the Unbound series. Mark Gatiss returns as a version of the Master from the same series, appearing in The Emporium at the End and The True Savior of the Universe, as well as a brief appearance in a flashback in The Library in the Body.

Volume 4: Ruler of the Universe (2017)

Volume 5: Buried Memories (2019)

Volume 6: Lost in Translation (2020)

Volume 7: Blood & Steel (2022)
David Warner died on 24 July 2022. Recording of the series had been completed and was released posthumously.

Other audio play appearances

 "The Shadow of the Scourge"
 "The Dark Flame"
 The Company of Friends: "Benny's Story"
 "Bernice Summerfield and the Criminal Code"
 "Love and War"
 "The Highest Science"
 "Theatre of War"
 "All-Consuming Fire"
 "Original Sin"
 "Short Trips: The Hesitation Deviation"
 "The Worlds of Big Finish: The Phantom Wreck"
 "The Eighth of March: The Big Blue Book"

See also

Doctor Who spin-offs
List of Bernice Summerfield characters

References

External links

 Big Finish Productions - Benny Summerfield

 
Literary characters introduced in 1992
Doctor Who spin-off companions
Doctor Who audio characters
Doctor Who book characters
Female characters in literature
Fictional archaeologists
Fictional professors